Pokrovska is a station on the Ukraine Dnipro Metro's Tsentralno–Zavodska Line. It is a sub-surface station, accessible by stairs and was opened on 29 December 1995 along with the rest of the system's first stations.

The station is located on the corner of the Yuria Kondratuka Street and the Velyka Diivska Street and in the Chervonyi Kamin and Pokrovsky (former Komunar) residential areas of Dnipro.

Until 24 November 2015, the station was named Komunarivska for the former name of Yuria Kondratuka Street - Komunarivska. The station was renamed in order to comply with decommunization law.

References

External links
 Dnipro Metropoliten - Pokrovska Station

Dnipro Metro stations
Railway stations opened in 1995
1995 establishments in Ukraine